"Say Yay!" is a song performed by Spanish singer Barei and written by herself, Rubén Villanueva and Víctor Púa Vivó. The song represented Spain in the Eurovision Song Contest 2016 held in Stockholm, Sweden. It is the first ever Spanish Eurovision entry that features no Spanish lyrics. The song was released as a digital download on 25 January 2016 through Gran Sol, reaching number-one on Spanish iTunes. A new version of the song was released on 11 March 2016 via Universal Music Spain. It was included in the re-issue of Barei's 2015 album Throw the Dice.

Eurovision Song Contest

In December 2015, Barei was announced as one of the six participants of Objetivo Eurovisión. The show was held on 1 February 2016, where Barei went on to receive top scores from Spanish televoters and the in-studio jury, winning the competition. She then represented Spain in the Eurovision Song Contest 2016, in Stockholm, Sweden. In the grand final that was held 14 May 2016, she had received 77 points at the end of the voting, placing 22nd in a field of 26 songs.

Live performances
Barei performed the song live for the first time on Objetivo Eurovisión on 1 February 2016, where she won the competition. After winning the show, she also performed the song on the morning show La mañana on La 1 on 3 February. On 13 February, Barei performed the song at the Ukrainian national final for the Eurovision Song Contest 2016 as a special guest during the second semi-final. On 5 March, Barei performed an acoustic version of "Say Yay!" at the El Intruso club in Madrid as a part of the city's Ellas Son-Arte festival. On 29 March, Barei performed an acoustic version of the song on the talk show Likes on #0. On 2 April, she performed "Say Yay!" at the Eurovision Pre-Party in Riga, Latvia, held at the Spikeri Concert Hall, and on 3 April, at the Eurovision Pre-Party in Moscow, Russia, held at the Izvestia Hall. Barei also performed the song during the 2016 Eurovision in Concert, the largest gathering of Eurovision artists outside of Eurovision itself, held in the Melkweg, a popular music venue in Amsterdam, the Netherlands on 9 April. On 17 April, Barei performed during the London Eurovision Party, which was held at the Café de Paris venue in London, United Kingdom. On 28 April, she performed the song at a party in her honour at the Swedish Embassy in Madrid.  On 29 April, she performed during a Spanish Eurovision party, which took place at the Palacio de la Prensa in Madrid.

Barei performed the song live during the final of the Eurovision Song Contest 2016 in Stockholm, Sweden on 14 May 2016. Laura García was the choreographer for this performance, while Florian Boje was the stage director. On stage, Barei was joined by five backing vocalists: Rebeca Rods, Milena Brody, Alana Sinkëy, Awinnie MyBaby and Brequette.

Music video
The official video of the song, directed by Gus Carballo, was filmed in February 2016 in different locations in Madrid, mainly in a tunnel at Las Tablas neighbourhood, and also features scenes filmed in Barcelona, Berlin, Havana, London, Miami and Stockholm. The video premiered on 10 March 2016 on RTVE's website.

Controversies
Member of the Royal Academy of Spanish Language José María Merino said that it was "unpresentable, senseless and stupid" for Spain to present a song at Eurovision without any Spanish lyrics.

Track listing

Charts

Weekly charts

Certifications

Release history

References

Eurovision songs of Spain
Eurovision songs of 2016
2015 songs
2016 singles
Universal Music Group singles
Universal Music Spain singles